It was a tradition in the French Royal Navy to name the largest ship Royal Louis after the French monarch; all Kings of France were named "Louis" from 1610 until the end of the French monarchy.  At least six ships bore this name:

 
 
 
 
 
  of 1811 was renamed Royal Louis in April 1814 (when Napoléon was reinstated, she reverted to Impérial in March 1815, but was again renamed Royal Louis in July 1815).

References

 Les « Royal Louis » de la Marine française (Nicolas Mioque)

French Navy ship names